The American nu metal band Slipknot has released seven studio albums, two live albums, one compilation album, one demo album, twenty-seven singles, five video albums and twenty-seven music videos. Formed in Des Moines, Iowa in 1995, Slipknot originally featured vocalist and percussionist Anders Colsefni, guitarists Donnie Steele and Josh "Gnar" Brainard, bassist Paul Gray, drummer Joey Jordison, and percussionist and backing vocalist Shawn "Clown" Crahan. The original lineup released its first demo Mate. Feed. Kill. Repeat. in 1996, before undergoing a number of lineup changes over the next few years.

Finalising its lineup as a nine-piece consisting of Corey Taylor (vocals), Mick Thomson, Jim Root (both guitars), Paul Gray (bass), Joey Jordison (drums), Shawn "Clown" Crahan, Chris Fehn (both percussion), Sid Wilson (turntables) and Craig Jones (samples), Slipknot signed with Roadrunner Records and released its self-titled debut album in June 1999. Slipknot reached number 51 on the US Billboard 200, and has since been certified double platinum by the Recording Industry Association of America (RIAA). The band followed this up in 2001 with Iowa, which reached number 3 on the Billboard 200 and topped the UK Albums Chart. Slipknot also released its first two videos during this period – Welcome to Our Neighborhood, a collection of music videos and live footage, in 1999, and Disasterpieces, a live concert recorded in London, in 2002.

After a short hiatus, Slipknot returned in 2004 with its third studio album Vol. 3: (The Subliminal Verses), which reached number 2 on the Billboard 200. The album was supported by a successful lead single in "Duality", which reached the top 10 of both the US Billboard Alternative Songs and Mainstream Rock charts. Later singles "Vermilion" and "Before I Forget" also registered on both charts. The band's first live album, 9.0: Live, followed the next year and reached the top 20 of the Billboard 200. Third video album Voliminal: Inside the Nine was released in December 2006. 2008's All Hope Is Gone, Slipknot's fourth studio album, was the band's first to top the Billboard 200, as well as several album charts in other regions. "Psychosocial", "Dead Memories" and "Snuff" all reached the Billboard Alternative Songs top 20.

On May 24, 2010, founding member Paul Gray died of an "accidental overdose of morphine and fentanyl" and in September 2010 the band dedicated its fourth video album (sic)nesses to the deceased bassist, which documented their performance at Download Festival in 2009. The release topped the Music Video charts in the US and the UK. A compilation album, Antennas to Hell, followed in 2012. After returning to touring in 2011 with former guitarist Donnie Steele on bass, Slipknot also parted ways with Joey Jordison in 2013 in controversial circumstances. The group resurfaced in 2014 with Alessandro Venturella on bass and Jay Weinberg on drums, releasing the Gray-dedicated .5: The Gray Chapter in October that year, which followed All Hope Is Gone in topping the Billboard 200.

The band fired longtime percussionist Chris Fehn after he sued the band for withholding payments from him prior to the release of the band's sixth studio album We Are Not Your Kind on August 9, 2019. We Are Not Your Kind was the band's third consecutive number one album on the US Billboard 200 and was the band's first UK number 1 on the UK Albums Chart in 18 years, since the release of Iowa. They subsequently replaced Fehn with Michael Pfaff for all future tour dates and recorded his first album with the band for their seventh studio album The End, So Far which was released on September 30, 2022 and their last to be released via Roadrunner Records.

As of 2019, Slipknot has sold 30 million units of records worldwide.

Demos 

 "1995 Demo"
 Year: 1995
 Description: 4-Track tape, recorded in December of 1995.

 "Excerpts From Current Project"
 Year: 1996
 Description: 3-Track tape.

 "Producer/Engineer Demo"
 Year: 1996
 Description: 4-Track tape, with the band "Nephilim"

 "Battle of the Bands Demo"
 Year: 1997
 Description: After beating Stone Sour in the Des Moines Safari Club battle of the bands, they were rewarded with studio time, in wich they recorded "Lust Disease" and "Nature".

 "Demo Tape 97"
 Year: 1997
 Description: 3-Track Tape.

 "SlipKnot"
 Year: 1997
 Description: The Fan-Known "Gold Disc" Anders Colsefni on vocals.

 "Anonymous Live Show"
 Year: November 9th, 1997
 Description: The Fan-Known "Silver Disc", Corey Taylor on vocals. It was the first leaked material of when the band changed vocalists.

 "4-Track Demo Tape"
 Year: 1998
 Description: Corey Taylor on vocals. Leaked on 2000.

 "Demo Tape 98"
 Year: 1998
 Description: 9th demo tape.

 "Indigo Sessions"
 Year: 1998
 Description: Unfinished mixes of the self-titled album.

Albums

Studio albums

Live albums

Compilation albums

Demo albums

Singles

Promotional singles

Other charted songs

Other appearances

Videos

Video albums

Music videos

See also
List of songs recorded by Slipknot

Footnotes

References

External links
Slipknot discography
Slipknot discography at AllMusic
Slipknot discography at Discogs
Slipknot discography at MusicBrainz

Discography
Slipknot
Slipknot